Fondi Italiani per le Infrastrutture SGR S.p.A. or, in short form, F2i SGR S.p.A., is Italy's largest independent infrastructure fund manager, with assets under management of approximately €5 billion. It currently manages three funds: F2i Second Fund (€1.24 billion, maturing in 2024), and F2i Third Fund (€3.6 billion of funding, maturing in 2030) and the Ania F2i Fund (Fourth Fund). The First Fund was successfully closed in December 2017.

History
F2i SGR was established on 23 January 2007 as an initiative of, among the others, Cassa Depositi e Prestiti, the two major Italian banks, Intesa Sanpaolo and Unicredit, banking foundations and insurance funds. Its portfolio currently numbers 19 companies, with an aggregate turnover of €4.4 billion and an EBITDA of €1.9 billion.

In May 2008 F2i finalized its first acquisition, by purchasing a 15.7% in Alerion Clean Power S.p.A.

After this, it acquired stakes in Enel Stoccaggi from Enel (49%) and Infrastrutture CIS (26%). In 2009 F2i became a shareholder of HFV (49.8%), Interporto Rivalta Scrivia (22.7%) and Enel Rete Gas (80%), through F2i Reti Italia S.r.l., for overall shareholdings of €550 million.

In July 2010, through F2i Rete Idrica Italiana S.p.A., it took over a 24% stake in San Giacomo S.r.l., the majority shareholder of Mediterranea delle Acque, for the establishment of a pole that would invest in water networks by exploiting the liberalisation of the sector: Iren held the remaining shares. The stake reached 40% in the months after.

In October 2010, F2i acquired a 65% stake in GESAC for €150 million (via 2i Aeroporti) - GESAC being the handling company that controls Naples-Capodichino Airport - and a 54% stake in Software Design, a company specialised in airport software.

In December 2010, alongside Finavias S.r.l. (AXA group) F2i invested €255 million for a 100% stake in E.ON Rete, a company belonging to the E.ON group, that is active in natural gas distribution in Italy with circa 600,000 clients in 300 Municipalities and a grid which extends for 9,100 kilometres. After this operation, F2i gained control of 50,000 kilometres of grid, over 2.7 million clients and a 15.8% market share.

In May 2011, a consortium made up of F2i (87.5%) and Intesa Sanpaolo (12.5%) took over more than 61.4% stake in Metroweb, a telecommunications company that controls a 330,000-kilometre-long optical fibre network covering an area of over 2.7 million inhabitants, mainly in the Municipality of Milan and partially in the rest of Lombardy. In September 2012 Intesa Sanpaolo sold the 12.5% stake to F2i for €20 million.

On 6 June 2011, alongside AXA, F2i acquired a 100% stake in G6 Rete Gas (owned by GDF Suez) for €772 million; G6 Rete Gas is active in methane gas distribution with 990,000 clients and 4 billion cubic metres of methane delivered through 13,000 kilometres of pipes. After this operation, F2i gained control of more than 18-20% of the gas distribution market.

In 2013–14 F2i acquired the controlling interests (54.46%) of Società Azionaria Gestione Aeroporto Torino.

In 2015 49% shares of 2i Aeroporti was sold to a consortium formed by Ardian and Crédit Agricole Assurances (a Crédit Agricole subsidiary).

In October 2015, F2i and Enel Green Power signed an agreement to create an equal joint venture in the photovoltaic segment which gave birth to EF Solare Italia. In December 2018, F2i became the sole shareholder of the company, acquiring the 50% stake previously owned by the Enel Group.
In March 2016, a consortium led by F2i acquired, through F2i Healthcare, 37.3% of KOS, one of the main players in the Italian long-term care sector. 
In December 2016 acquired 72.5% of So.Ge.A.Al (Alghero Airport).
In 2017, F2i acquired, through 2i Fiber (80% F2i and 20% Marguerite), Infracom, Mc-Link and KPNQWEST Italia, aiming to integrate them into a single platform: in 2018 the acquired companies merge into a newco, IRIDEOS.
Towards the end of 2017, F2i acquires 100% of Sanmarco Bioenergie, 
In 2018, acting on behalf of its second fund, F2i acquires Enel Group's entire portfolio of vegetable biomass plants and one of Europe's foremost operators in the production of electric energy from vegetable biomass, becoming leader in the sector in Italy and further reinforcing its presence in the renewable energy sector.
In July 2018, F2i acquires RTR, a European leader in the production of renewable energies by solar plants with 134 plants in Italy for a total capacity of 334 MWp. 
In October 2018, F2i gave birth to the first independent operator of telecommunication towers, after a successful OPA on EI Towers launched in 2017 through 2i Towers (60% F2i and 40% Mediaset).
In November 2018, through Farmacie Italiane (61.2% owned by F2i Third Fund), F2i completed the take over of Gruppo Farmacrimi.
In June 2019, F2i and EI Towers acquired Italian broadcaster Persidera.
In July 2019, through 2i Aeroporti (51% owned by F2i), F2i acquired 55% of Trieste Airport – Aeroporto Friuli Venezia Giulia.
In August 2019 F2i created F2i Holding Portuale, the infrastructure fund's port group.
Early November 2019 F2i divested its assets in Software Design and SIA.
In December 2019, through EF Solare, F2i acquired Spanish solar energy company Renovalia, raising its operational renewable energy portfolio to 1GW and becoming European leader of the sector.
In April 2020 F2i announced its first investment through the Ania F2i Fund, acquiring a 92.5% stake in CFI – Compagnia Ferroviaria Italiana, Italy's third largest freight operator.
In August 2020 F2i presented its First Integrated Sustainability Report.
In October 2020, F2i SGR, together with Asterion Industrial Partners, completed the acquisition of Sorgenia, thus creating an integrated provider of energy transition technologies, with an installed capacity of around 4,800 Megawatts.
On 23 October 2020 F2i signed an agreement to acquire 80% of Geasar S.p.A., the Olbia Costa Smeralda Airport management company, from Alisarda S.p.A.

At the beginning of 2021 F2i signed an agreement for the sale to Crédit Agricole Assurances of a 30% stake in EF Solare Italia, keeping the remaining 70%.

It also signed an agreement with Edison for the sale of its stake (70%) in E2i Energie Speciali.

Investment sectors 
The companies belonging to the F2i network make up the country's main infrastructure platform, spanning key sectors of the national economy:
 Energy for Transition
 Distribution Networks
 Telecommunication Networks
 Transport and Logistics
 Health and social care infrastructure

Shareholders of F2i SGR
The subscribers of F2i funds are major institutional investors, both Italian and foreign: banks, banking foundations, asset managers, sovereign wealth funds, social security institutions and pension funds.

F2i Second Fund  
In October 2012, being that the initial 1.85 billion had already been almost completely invested, F2i launched its Second Fund, which completed its fund raising in July 2015 reaching a total fund size of 1.24 billion, above the initial target of 1.2 billion.
Second Fund's portfolio:
 SEA - 8,6%
 e2i Energie Speciali - 70%
 2i Rete Gas – 8,11%
 IRIDEOS – 78,4%
 KOS – 40,5%
 San Marco Bioenergie – 100%
 Veronagest – 100%

F2i Third Fund 
In 2017 F2i launched a Third Fund. After a 3.14 billion first closing, at the final closing the fund raised an overall amount of 3.6 billion euro, after that the initial 3.3 billion target had been raised. 
Third Fund's portfolio:
 2i Rete Gas - 63,90%
 IREN Acqua - 40%
 2i Aeroporti - 51%
 GESAC - 87%
 SEA - 36,4%
 SAGAT - 90,3%
 Aeroporto di Bologna - 10%
 Aeroporto Friuli Venezia Giulia - Trieste Airport – 55%
 So.Ge.A.Al - 71,25%
 Infracis - 26,3%
 F2i Holding Portuale - 99,5%
 Farmacie Italiane Srl - 61,2%
 EF Solare Italia – 100%
 EI Towers - 97,4%
 RTR – 100%
 Persidera – 100%
Fonte: f2isgr.it

Ania F2i Fourth Fund 
In February 2020, the first closing of a fourth fund launched by Ania - the National Association of Insurance Companies - and managed by F2i, was announced.
Fourth Fund's portfolio:
CFI – Compagnia Ferroviaria Italiana 97,5%

Divested assets 
 Interporto Rivalta Scrivia (October 2011)
 Enel Stoccaggi (February 2012)
 TRM (January 2016)
 Metroweb (December 2016)
 Alerion Clean Power (December 2017)
 Software Design (November 2019)
 SIA (November 2019)

Sustainability 
In March 2019, F2i signed up the Principles for Responsible Investments promoted by the United Nations.
In August 2020, F2i presented its first Integrated sustainability report.

Awards 
 In February 2019 won the PFI “Deal of the Year” Award for the acquisition on the solar energy company RTR

References

External links

 

Investment management companies of Italy
2007 establishments in Italy